Ellen Conford (March 20, 1942 – March 20, 2015) was an author for children and young adults. Among her writings are the Annabel the Actress and Jenny Archer series.  Her books have won the Best Book of the Year Citation, Best Book of the International Interest Citation, Best Book of the Year for Children, Parents' Choice Award, and more.

Several of her stories have been adapted for television, sometimes by Conford herself. Her children's book And This is Laura and the story Revenge of the Incredible Dr. Rancid and His Youthful Assistant, Jeffrey became ABC Weekend Specials, while her young adult novels Dear Lovey Hart, I Am Desperate became an ABC Afterschool Special and The Alfred G. Graebner Memorial High School Handbook of Rules and Regulations was a CBS Schoolbreak Special.

Born in New York City, New York, Conford attended Hofstra College from 1959 to 1962. She died on March 20, 2015, her 73rd birthday.

Bibliography

Novels

Dreams of Victory (1973)
Felicia the Critic (1973)
Me and the Terrible Two (1974)
The Luck of Pokey Bloom (1975)
Dear Lovey Hart, I Am Desperate (1975)
The Alfred G. Graebner Memorial High School Handbook of Rules and Regulations (1976)    - ALA Notable Young Adult Book
And This is Laura (1977)
Hail, Hail, Camp Timberwood (1978)
Anything for a Friend (1979)
We Interrupt This Semester for an Important Bulletin (1979)
Revenge of the Incredible Dr. Rancid and His Youthful Assistant, Jeffrey (1980)
Seven Days to a Brand New Me (1981)
To All My Fans With Love from Sylvie (1982)
Lenny Kandell, Smart Aleck (1983)
You Never Can Tell (1984)
Why Me? (1985)
Strictly for Laughs (1985)
A Royal Pain (1986)
The Things I Did For Love (1987)
Genie With the Light Blue Hair (1989)
Loving Someone Else (1991)
Dear Mom, Get Me Out of Here! (1992)
My Sister the Witch (1995)
Norman Newman and the Werewolf of Walnut Street (1995)
The Frog Princess of Pelham (1997)
Diary of a Monster's Son (1999)
Loathe at first sight (2000)
Annabel the actress (2000)
loathe of first sight

Picture books
Impossible, Possum (1971)
Why Can't I Be William? (1972)
Just the Thing for Geraldine (1974)
Eugene the Brave (1978)

Series

Annabel the Actress
Annabel the Actress: Starring in Gorilla My Dreams (1999)
Annabel the Actress: Starring in Just a Little Extra (2000)
Annabel the Actress: Starring In Hound of the Barkervilles (2002)
Annabel the Actress: Starring in Camping It Up (2004)

Jenny Archer
A Job for Jenny Archer (1988)
A Case for Jenny Archer (1988)
Jenny Archer, Author (1989)
What's Cooking, Jenny Archer? (1989)
Jenny Archer to the Rescue (1990)
Can Do, Jenny Archer (1992)
Nibble, Nibble, Jenny Archer (1993)
Get the Picture Jenny Archer? (1993)

Anthologies
Shelf Life: Stories by the Book (2003)

Collections
If This is Love, I'll Take Spaghetti (1990)
'I Love You, I Hate You, Get Lost (1994)
Crush (1998)

References

2015 deaths
1942 births
20th-century American novelists
21st-century American novelists
American children's writers
American women novelists
Writers from New York City
Hofstra University alumni
20th-century American women writers
21st-century American women writers
Novelists from New York (state)